Nizhneakbashevo (Tübän Aqbaş) is a rural locality (a village) in Sharipovsky Selsoviet, Kushnarenkovsky District, Bashkortostan, Russia. The population was 184 as of 2010. There are 13 streets.

Geography 
Nizhneakbashevo is located 26 km southeast of Kushnarenkovo (the district's administrative centre) by road. Sredneakbashevo is the nearest rural locality.

References 

Rural localities in Kushnarenkovsky District